Michael D. Johnson is a former President of John Carroll University. Before that he was the Dean of the Cornell University School of Hotel Administration. He also is an E.M. Statler Professor of Hotel Administration.

Early life and education
Johnson earned Bachelor of Science from the University of Wisconsin–Madison. He later earned both his Ph.D. and Master of Business Administration from University of Chicago.

Professorships
Until July 2006, Johnson was the D. Maynard Phelps Collegiate Professor of Business Administration and professor of marketing at the Stephen M. Ross School of Business at the University of Michigan.

Cornell 
On May 4, 2005, the Cornell School of Hotel Administration announced that they had hired Mr. Johnson. He took the post in July 2006.

H ADM 110 
Every freshman in the Hotel School is scheduled to take H ADM 110, also known as the Distinguished Lecture Series. This class is hosted by  Mr. Johnson and features guest from the hospitality industry who speak to the students and field questions.

John Carroll 
On June 1, 2018 Michael D. Johnson became the 25th president in John Carroll's history. The University's Board of Directors had previously elected him to the position on December 6, 2017. On September 6, 2018 he was formally installed as president, but on June 1, 2021 he stepped down from this role.

References 

Year of birth missing (living people)
Cornell University faculty
Living people
University of Wisconsin–Madison alumni
University of Chicago Booth School of Business alumni
University of Michigan faculty